LORA ("Long Range Attack") is a theater quasi-ballistic missile produced in Israel.

It can be ship-launched from inside of a standard Intermodal container as well as land-launched.

In 2018, it has been offered for sale to the Israel Defense Forces, but a decision on purchasing it has not yet been made. Also in 2018 it was confirmed that the Azerbaijani Land Forces had purchased the system.

LORA was used in the final days of the 2020 Nagorno-Karabakh war, being used to target a vital bridge in the Lachin corridor linking Armenia to the Nagorno-Karabakh region. It was initially thought to have destroyed the bridge, but later evidence suggested it had only inflicted limited damage.

Comparable systems
Predator Hawk
Hadès
Nasr
Oka
Tochka
Prahaar
MGM-140B/E ATACMS
Iskander
Persian Gulf
Fateh-110
Šumadija  (multiple rocket launcher)
Khalij Fars

References

External links

LORA brochure on IAI website
LORA on IAI website

LORA on defense-update website
LORA on Deagel website

Tactical ballistic missiles
Guided missiles of Israel
IAI missiles
MLM products